Frank Cochrane (28 October 1882 – 21 May 1962) was a British stage and film actor. Born in Durham, England. Amongst his stage work, he starred in the original production of Chu Chin Chow at His Majesty's Theatre in London in 1916; as well as in the 1934 film version.

Selected filmography
 Brigadier Gerard (1915)
 The Yellow Mask (1930)
 Chu Chin Chow (1934)
 McGlusky the Sea Rover (1935)
 Bulldog Drummond at Bay (1937)
 What a Man! (1938)
 Warning to Wantons (1949)

References

External links

1882 births
1962 deaths
Actors from County Durham
English male film actors
English male stage actors
20th-century English male actors